
Year 442 (CDXLII) was a common year starting on Thursday (link will display the full calendar) of the Julian calendar. At the time, it was known as the Year of the Consulship of Dioscorus and Eudoxius (or, less frequently, year 1195 Ab urbe condita). The denomination 442 for this year has been used since the early medieval period, when the Anno Domini calendar era became the prevalent method in Europe for naming years.

Events 
 By place 
 Europe 
 Valentinian III forms a marriage proposal for his eldest daughter Eudocia and Genseric's son Huneric. He is already married to a Visigoth princess, and Genseric decides to free him of his obligations by accusing her of trying to poison him. He leaves her mutilated - her ears and nose are cut off - and sends her back to her father Theodoric I, in Toulouse (Gaul).
 The Huns, on a military campaign along the Danube and the Great Morava, destroy the city of Naissus (modern Serbia). They have mastered siege technology and are able to capture fortified cities. The Roman Senate agrees to pay Attila a tribute of 700 pounds of gold per year.
 Eógan mac Néill, founder of the kingdom of Ailech (County Tyrone), is baptized by Saint Patrick. He becomes the first Catholic High King of Ireland.

 Africa 
 Emperor Valentinian III signs a peace treaty with King Genseric, and recognises the Vandal Kingdom. He grants him sovereignty over most of Africa. Genseric gives back Sicily and Mauretania (Algeria and Morocco). This marks the end of the Vandal migrations; they settle in North Africa, with Carthage as their capital.

 By topic 
 Religion 
 The Monastery of St. Shenouda the Archimandrite (White Monastery) near Sohag (Egypt) is built.

Births 
 Feng, Chinese empress and regent of the Northern Wei Dynasty (d. 490)
 Isidore of Miletus, Byzantine architect and mathematician (d. 537)
 Placidia, Roman empress and daughter of Valentinian III (approximate date)
 Angelus Daemonicus, Roman general (d. ?)

Deaths 
 Veh Mihr Shapur, Sasanian military officer and Marzban of Armenia

References